Saul Avimael Sanchez (born 12 June 1997) is an American professional boxer.

Professional boxing career
Sanchez made his professional boxing debut against Temoatzin Landeros Castillo on 6 February 2016. He won the fight by a third-round knockout. He amassed an 11–0 record during the next two years, before being scheduled to fight Brandon Leon Benitez for the vacant WBO Latino bantamweight title on 10 May 2019. He won the fight by an eight-round knockout. Sanchez faced Edwin Rodriguez on 23 August 2019, in his second fight of the year, and suffered an upset split decision loss.

After suffering the first loss of his professional career, Sanchez bounced back with a unanimous decision victory against the overmatched Victor Trejo Garcia on 21 February 2020. Sanchez was then booked to face Daniel Lozano for the vacant WBA Fedecentro super bantamweight title on 9 October 2020, in the main event of a "Boxeo Telemundo" card. He won the fight by a first-round knockout, dropping Lozano trice by the 2:14 minute mark of the opening round. Sanchez next faced Mario Hernandez on 20 December 2020. He won the fight by unanimous decision, with scores of 78–74, 79–73 and 78–74.

Sanchez dropped back down to bantamweight in order to face Frank Gonzalez for the vacant WBA Fedecentro bantamweight title on 19 March 2021. He made quick work of his opponent, stopping him at the 1:47 minute mark of the opening round. Sanchez then faced JaRico O'Quinn in the main event of the 24 September 2021 "ShoBox Next Generation" card. He achieved his career-best victory, as he stopped O'Quinn with a flurry of shots in the first round. Sanchez faced the journeyman Jose Estrella, in his third and final fight of the year, on 17 December 2021. He won the fight by a third-round knockout.

Sanchez is scheduled to face Eros Correa on 17 June 2022, in the main event of a Thompson Boxing's card, which took place at the Doubletree Events Center, in Ontario, California. He lost the fight by split decision. One judge scored the bout 96–94 for Sanchez, while the remaining two judges scored it 98–92 and 97–93 for Correa.

Professional boxing record

References

Living people
1997 births
American male boxers
People from Encino, Los Angeles
Boxers from Los Angeles
Super-flyweight boxers
Bantamweight boxers
Super-bantamweight boxers